Those Endearing Young Charms may refer to:

Believe Me, if All Those Endearing Young Charms, an Irish folk song
Those Endearing Young Charms, a 1943 play by Jerome Chodorov
Those Endearing Young Charms (film), a 1945 American film based on Chodorov's play
Those Endearing Young Charms (TV series), a short-lived television series that aired in 1952